Chaiyasiri was a ruler of the Singhanavati City-State Kingdom in Thailand, prior to the Sukhothai Period.

Accomplishments
According to M. de la Loubere, Chaiyasiri is said to have built the city of Pipeli in Phetchaburi Province.

Move to Nakhon Thai
Chayasiri, along with many of his subjects, moved to Nakhon Thai in Phitsanulok Province in 1088, making Nakhon Thai the capital of the Singhanavati Kingdom for a period of time.

Rulers of the Singhanavati